The 1980 Giro d'Italia was the 63rd edition of the Giro d'Italia, one of cycling's Grand Tours. The Giro began in Genoa, with a prologue individual time trial on 15 May, and Stage 11 occurred on 27 May with a stage to Campotenese. The race finished in Milan on 7 June.

Prologue
15 May 1980 — Genoa,  (ITT)

Stage 1
16 May 1980 — Genoa to Imperia,

Stage 2
17 May 1980 — Imperia to Turin,

Stage 3
18 May 1980 — Turin to Parma,

Stage 4
19 May 1980 — Parma to Marina di Pisa,

Stage 5
20 May 1980 — Pontedera to Pisa,  (ITT)

Rest day
21 May 1980

Stage 6
22 May 1980 — Rio Marina to Portoferraio,

Stage 7
23 May 1980 — Castiglione della Pescaia to Orvieto,

Stage 8
24 May 1980 — Orvieto to Fiuggi,

Stage 9
25 May 1980 — Fiuggi to Sorrento,

Stage 10
26 May 1980 — Sorrento to Palinuro,

Stage 11
27 May 1980 — Palinuro to Campotenese,

References

1980 Giro d'Italia
Giro d'Italia stages